State Road 18 (SR 18) in the U.S. State of Indiana is an east–west route in North Central Indiana running from the Illinois border in Benton County almost to the Ohio border, terminating at U.S. Route 27 (US 27)/State Road 67 (SR 67) in Jay County.  State Route 18 is mainly a 2-lane road with exception of 4-lane divided highway from Marion to Interstate 69 (I-69).  Marion is the only considerably large city that Route 18 passes through.  State Route 18 runs just south of the lakes region, with Lake Shafer, Lake Freeman, Mississinewa Reservoir, and Salamonie Reservoir not too far to the north.  With the exception of Marion, Route 18 passes through mostly small towns.  The terrain is mostly level and is utilized mostly for agriculture.

Route description 
SR 18 heads east from the western terminus at the Illinois State line.  Then SR 18 has an intersection with State Road 71.  SR 18 heads east having an intersection with U.S. Route 41.  Then SR 18 heads east towards Fowler, when in Fowler SR 18 begins a concurrency with U.S. Route 52 and State Road 55.  All three routes head southeast, until SR 18 turns due east.  SR 18 heads east towards Brookston, passing through an intersection with U.S. Route 231 and an interchange with Interstate 65 (I-65).  In Brookston SR 18 has a concurrency with State Road 43.  From Brookston SR 18 heads east towards Pittsburg, just west of Pittsburg SR 18, begins a concurrency with U.S. Route 421, and State Road 39.  All three route heads southeast towards Delphi, west of downtown Delphi State Road 25 joins the concurrency.  Then all four routes turn northeast towards downtown Delphi.  When in downtown Delphi SR 25 leaves the concurrency on a northeast route as US 421/SR 18/SR 39 turn southeast.  South of Delphi SR 18 leaves the concurrency with US 421 and SR 39.  SR 18 heads due east towards Flora where SR 18 has an intersection with State Road 75.  SR 18 heads east towards Galveston passing through a concurrency with State Road 29.  In Galveston SR 18 has an intersection with U.S. Route 35.  Then just east of Galveston SR 18 has an intersection with U.S. Route 31.

From US 31, SR 18 heads east towards Converse passing through a concurrency with State Road 19.  SR 18 then heads through Converse, after Converse SR 18 has a concurrency with State Road 13.  SR 18 turns southeast towards Marion passing through Sweetser.  In Marion eastbound SR 18 is on a Fourth Street and westbound SR 18 is on Third Street and Second Street.  East of Marion the one-way streets become a four-lane highway.  SR 18 heads east towards Montpelier passing through an interchange with I-69 and passing through an intersection with State Road 5 and State Road 3.  East of Montpelier SR 18 passes through an intersection with State Road 1.  Then SR 18 heads east towards its eastern terminus near Bryant at an intersection with US 27 and SR 67, from this intersection SR 67 heads east towards Ohio.

Major intersections

References

External links

018
Transportation in Benton County, Indiana
Transportation in White County, Indiana
Transportation in Carroll County, Indiana
Transportation in Cass County, Indiana
Transportation in Miami County, Indiana
Transportation in Grant County, Indiana
Transportation in Blackford County, Indiana
Transportation in Jay County, Indiana